Alexander McKenzie FRS (6 December 1869, Dundee – 11 June 1951) was a Scottish chemist, specializing in stereochemistry. Kinetic resolution by synthetic means was first reported in 1899 by Marckwald and McKenzie.

Life

After education at the High School of Dundee from 1882 to 1885, McKenzie matriculated in 1885 at the University of St Andrews, where he studied Chemistry under Prof Thomas Purdie FRS and graduated in 1889 with M.A. in 1889 and in 1891 with the research degree B.Sc. in chemistry. At St Andrews, he was from 1891 to 1893 a lecture assistant to Thomas Purdie, from 1893 to 1896 a "university assistant" engaged in teaching, and from 1896 to 1898 a research assistant to Purdie in stereochemistry and optical activity. In 1898 McKenzie went to the University of Berlin to work under Landolt and received there in 1899 his D.Sc. He left Berlin in 1901 after receiving his Ph.D. under the supervision of Marckwald and went to London's  Jenner Institute, where he stayed until 1902. At Birbeck College, London, McKenzie was from 1902 to 1905 an assistant lecturer and demonstrator and from 1905 to 1914 head of the chemistry department. At University College, Dundee, he held the chair of chemistry from 1914 until his retirement in 1938.

McKenzie was the author or co-author of over 100 research papers. He was elected F.R.S. in 1916. Much of his research in the early part of his career deal with asymmetric synthesis.

Selected publications
with Henry Wren: 
with H. Wren:

References

1869 births
1951 deaths
Scientists from Dundee
People educated at the High School of Dundee
Alumni of the University of St Andrews
Scottish chemists
British chemists
Fellows of the Royal Society